The 1909 Newfoundland general election was held on 8 May 1909 to elect members of the 22nd General Assembly of Newfoundland in the Dominion of Newfoundland. The Newfoundland People's Party led by Edward P. Morris, having secured a majority, formed the government.

Seat totals

Members elected
 Bay de Verde
 John C. Crosbie People's Party
 Jesse Whiteway People's Party
 Bonavista Bay
 Sydney Blandford People's Party
 William C. Winsor People's Party
 Donald Morison People's Party
 Burgeo-LaPoile
 Robert Moulton People's Party
 Burin
 Henry Gear Liberal
 Edward H. Davey Liberal
 Thomas LeFeuvre People's Party, elected in 1911
 Carbonear
 John Goodison People's Party
 Ferryland
 Michael P. Cashin People's Party
 Phillip F. Moore People's Party
 Fogo
 Henry Earle Liberal
 Fortune Bay
 Charles Emerson People's Party
 Harbour Grace
 A. W. Piccott People's Party
 A. H. Seymour People's Party
 E. Parsons People's Party
 Harbour Main
 William Woodford People's Party
 J. J. Murphy People's Party
 Placentia and St. Mary's
 R. J. Devereaux People's Party
 William R. Howley People's Party
 Frank J. Morris People's Party
 Port de Grave
 William R. Warren People's Party (speaker)
 St. Barbe
 William M. Clapp Liberal
 St. George's
 Joseph F. Downey People's Party
 St. John's East
 James M. Kent Liberal
 George Shea Liberal
 J. Dwyer Liberal
 St. John's West
 Edward P. Morris People's Party
 John R. Bennett People's Party
 Michael J. Kennedy People's Party
 Trinity Bay
 Richard A. Squires People's Party
 Robert Watson People's Party
 E.G. Grant People's Party
 Twillingate
 Robert Bond Liberal
 James A. Clift Liberal
 George Roberts Liberal

References 
 

1909
1909 elections in North America
1909 elections in Canada
Politics of the Dominion of Newfoundland
1909 in Newfoundland
May 1909 events